IRV or Irv or variant, may refer to:

Instant-runoff voting, a type of ranked preferential voting counting method used in single-seat elections with more than two candidates
Irvine railway station, North Ayrshire, Scotland (National Rail station code IRV)
Anton Irv (1886–1919), Estonian soldier
Irv (given name)

See also

 
 
 
 Irvin
 Irvine (disambiguation)
 Irving (disambiguation)
 Irve (disambiguation)